Shan Liu is a village in Sai Kung District, Hong Kong.

Administration
Shan Liu is a recognized village under the New Territories Small House Policy.

History
At the time of the 1911 census, the population of Shan Liu was 73. The number of males was 33.

References

External links
 Delineation of area of existing village Shan Liu (Sai Kung) for election of resident representative (2019 to 2022)

Villages in Sai Kung District, Hong Kong